"Homer the Father" is the twelfth episode of the twenty-second season of the American animated television series The Simpsons. It originally aired on the Fox network in the United States on January 23, 2011. Joel H. Cohen won the Writers Guild of America Award for Outstanding Writing in Animation at the 64th Writers Guild of America Awards for his script to this episode.

Plot
Homer becomes obsessed with a 1980s family sitcom called Thicker Than Waters and starts acting like the show's father. Emulating this character's values, he refuses to give Bart a mini-bike he wants, because Bart would never learn to appreciate things if they come to him too easily.

Bart then realizes that he could sell secrets about the Springfield Nuclear Power Plant to other countries. He agrees to sell them to China in exchange for a mini-bike. To gain access to the nuclear plant's computer system, Bart begins doing typical father-son activities with Homer, eventually leading to Homer bringing Bart to work. When Homer falls asleep, Bart goes around the plant downloading information onto a USB storage device.

After Bart leaves the flashdrive with the downloaded data at the zoo and takes the bike, Homer reveals to him that he has bought him a mini-bike for being such a good child. Bart, feeling bad for betraying his country and his father, rushes back to the zoo in an attempt to recover the flashdrive. There, he meets the Chinese agents, who threaten to kill him if he does not cooperate. Homer steps in and offers himself in Bart's place, as he has a lifetime of nuclear experience. In China, he leads the construction of a nuclear power plant, which explodes right after the grand opening ceremony. Outside his hotel, he refuses to move out of the way of a taxi that would not take him to the airport for less than $20 in a reference to the photograph of a protester standing in front of a line of tanks during the 1989 Tiananmen Square protests. Back at the house, Bart tells Homer how much he appreciates him, and that they have "the best kind of bonding": sitting in front of the television while making no eye contact at all.

Reception
In its original American broadcast, "Homer the Father" was viewed by an estimated 6.5 million households with a 3.1 rating/7 share among adults between the ages of 18 and 49. The number of viewers increased slightly from the previous week and the 18-49 demographic stayed steady, in spite of going up against the hugely-viewed  AFC Championship. In Canada, the episode was watched by 962,000 viewers.

Tvfanatic.com, gave the episode a 3.8 out of 5, stating, "This week's installment was loaded with plenty of hilarious meta jokes about the television industry, thanks to its storyline about Homer mimicking his favorite '80s sitcom father, who seemed to be a mishmash of every fictional patriarch from that decade."

References

External links 
 
 "Homer the Father" at theSimpsons.com

2001 American television episodes
The Simpsons (season 22) episodes